Pediatric crowns are dental crowns used for restoring lost or damaged or decayed  teeth of children. These crowns encircle the damaged teeth completely and are made of different materials such as ceramic, steel and more.

Types

Stainless steel crowns have been used from 1940. These are employed in milk teeth or primary teeth and are also known as silver crowns. They are very durable, corrosion resistant and are advantageous in protecting the decayed tooth of children. Stainless steel crowns can be made esthetic by veneering composite using the open face technique or composite veneering done after sand-blasting SSCs. Also, composite veneering can be done after preparing retentive grooves on the buccal surface of stainless steel crowns.

Composite crowns are made of hardening composite material with clear plastic or mold. They are widely used in restoring the anterior teeth of children. These crowns provide esthetic restoration  and the materials used in this crown are affordable,  but they are more prone to fracture.

Polycarbonate crowns are made of polycarbonate resin shells with micro-glass fibers and have been temporarily used to restore children's teeth. They are slightly translucent and tooth colored.

Resin veneer crowns are a combination of stainless steel and resin. They are widely used for intermediate to long-term restorations.

Pediatric zirconia ceramic crowns are made of zirconium oxide stabilized with yttrium oxide. These are highly durable and are used for restoring both primary anterior and posterior teeth. They have been in use for children since 2010.

References 

Prosthodontology
Restorative dentistry